Mikhail Feodosievich Ivakhnenko (1947–2015) was a Russian paleontologist. In the 1980s, he graduated with a PhD from the University of Leningrad with a dissertation on procolophonids. He later worked at the Paleontological Institute at the Russian Academy of Sciences. His research largely focused on Permian synapsids and reptiles, having published over 50 works and naming 130 new fossil species.

He is buried at the Bykovskoye Memorial Cemetery.

References 

 
1947 births
Date of birth missing
2015 deaths
Date of death missing
Place of birth missing
Place of death missing
Russian paleontologists
Saint Petersburg State University alumni